Staind  is an American rock band from Springfield, Massachusetts, formed in 1995. The original lineup consisted of lead vocalist and rhythm guitarist Aaron Lewis, lead guitarist Mike Mushok, bassist and backing vocalist Johnny April, and drummer Jon Wysocki. The lineup has been stable outside of the 2011 departure of Wysocki, who was replaced by Sal Giancarelli. Staind has recorded seven studio albums: Tormented (1996), Dysfunction (1999), Break the Cycle (2001), 14 Shades of Grey (2003), Chapter V (2005), The Illusion of Progress (2008), and Staind (2011). The band was most successful in the early 2000s, with Break the Cycle going five times platinum in the United States and producing a top-five Billboard Hot 100 hit with its lead single "It's Been Awhile". Break the Cycle, along with the band's following two full-length albums, also topped the Billboard 200, and the two after peaked within the top five. Several of their other singles also became rock and pop hits, including "Fade", "For You", "Price to Play", "So Far Away", and "Right Here".

The band's activity became more sporadic after their self-titled release, with Lewis pursuing a solo country music career and Mushok subsequently joining the band Saint Asonia, but they have continued to tour on and off in the following years. In 2016, Lewis reiterated that the band had not broken up, and would possibly create another album, but that his then-current focus was on his solo career. The band reunited more permanently in 2019 for several shows, continuing with live appearances in 2020.

History

Early years and Tormented (1995–1998)
In 1993, vocalist Aaron Lewis and guitarist Mike Mushok met at a Christmas party in Springfield, Massachusetts. Mushok introduced drummer Jon Wysocki while Lewis brought in bassist Johnny April to form the band in 1995. Their first public performance was in February 1995, playing a heavy, dark, and introspective style of metal. Extensive touring in the Northeast helped Staind acquire a regional following over the next few years.

The band started covering Korn, Rage Against the Machine, Pearl Jam, Tool, and Alice in Chains, among others, and played at local clubs (most commonly playing at Infinity, a live music venue located in Springfield) for a year and a half. Staind self-released their debut album, Tormented, in November 1996, citing Tool, Faith No More, and Pantera as their influences. In October 1997, Staind acquired a concert slot through Aaron's cousin Justin Cantor with Limp Bizkit. Just prior to the performance, Limp Bizkit frontman Fred Durst was appalled by Staind's grotesque album cover and unsuccessfully attempted to remove them from the bill. Durst thought that Staind were Theistic Satanists. After being persuaded to let them perform, however, Durst was so impressed that he signed them to Flip Records by February 1998.

Dysfunction (1999–2000)
On April 13, 1999, Staind released their major label debut Dysfunction on Flip Records. The album, which was co-produced by Fred Durst and Terry Date (who also produced acts like Soundgarden, Deftones, and Pantera), received comparisons to alternative metal giants Tool and Korn. In particular, Aaron Lewis was lauded for his vocals, which were likened to those of Pearl Jam's Eddie Vedder.

The album achieved slow success, reaching the No. 1 spot on Billboard's Heatseeker Charts almost six months after its debut. In the same week, the record jumped to No. 74 on Billboard's Top 200 Album Charts. The nine-track LP (with one hidden track, "Excess Baggage") produced three singles, "Just Go", "Mudshovel", and "Home". "Mudshovel" and "Home" both received radio play, cracking the Top 20 of Billboard's Modern Rock and Mainstream Rock charts. In promotion of Dysfunction, Staind went on several tours, including the Family Values Tour with acts like Limp Bizkit and The Crystal Method, as well as opening for Sevendust's headlining tour.

Break the Cycle (2001–2002)

Staind toured with Limp Bizkit for the Family Values Tour during the fall of 1999, where Aaron Lewis performed an early version of "Outside" with Fred Durst at the Mississippi Coast Coliseum. Staind released their third studio album, Break the Cycle, on May 22, 2001. Propelled by the success of the first single, "It's Been Awhile", the album debuted at No. 1 on Billboard's Top 200 Album charts, selling 716,000 copies in its first week. The record's first-week sales were the second highest of any album that year, behind Creed's Weathered.

Break the Cycle saw the band retaining the nu metal sound from their previous album. Despite this, the album saw the band going further into a post-grunge sound which is evident in the smash hit song "It's Been Awhile", and the song led critics to compare the band to several other post-grunge bands at the time. The record spawned the singles "It's Been Awhile" (which hit the Billboard Top 10), "Fade", "Outside", "For You", and the acoustic ballad "Epiphany". "It's Been Awhile" spent a total of 16 and 14 weeks on top of the modern and mainstream rock charts respectively, making it one of the highest joint numbers of all time. In 2001, Break the Cycle sold four million copies worldwide, making it one of the best selling albums that year. Break the Cycle would go on to sell seven million copies worldwide, making this Staind's bestselling album.

14 Shades of Grey (2003–2004)
In early 2003, Staind embarked on a worldwide tour to promote the release of the follow-up to Break the Cycle, 14 Shades of Grey, which sold two million copies and debuted at number 1 on the Billboard 200. The album saw a departure from their previous nu metal sound as it mostly contained a lighter and more melodic post-grunge sound. 14 Shades of Grey produced two mainstream hits, "Price to Play" and "So Far Away", which spent 14 weeks on top of the rock chart. In addition, two other singles were released: "How About You" and "Zoe Jane".   The band's appearance at the Reading Festival during their 2003 tour had another impromptu acoustic set, this time due to equipment failure. The singles "So Far Away" and "Price to Play" came with two unreleased tracks, "Novocaine" and "Let It Out", which were released for the special edition of the group's subsequent album Chapter V, which came out in late 2005. In 2003, Staind unsuccessfully sued their logo designer Jon Stainbrook in New York Federal Court for attempting to re-use the logo he had sold to the band. They re-opened the case in mid-2005.

Chapter V and The Singles (2005–2007)

Staind's fifth album, titled Chapter V, was released on August 9, 2005, and became their third consecutive album to top the Billboard 200. The album opened to sales of 185,000 and has since been certified platinum in the U.S. The first single, "Right Here", was the biggest success from the album, garnering much mainstream radio play and peaking at number 1 on the mainstream rock chart. "Falling" was released as the second single, followed by "Everything Changes" and "King of All Excuses". Staind went on the road when the album came out, doing live shows and promoting it for a full year, including participating in the Fall Brawl tour with P.O.D., Taproot, and Flyleaf; they also had a solo tour across Europe and a mini-promotional tour in Australia for the first time. Other live shows included a cover of Pantera's "This Love", a tribute to Dimebag Darrell. Staind appeared on The Howard Stern Show on August 10, 2005 to promote Chapter V. They performed acoustic renditions of the single "Right Here" and Beetlejuice's song "This is Beetle". In early November 2005, Staind released the limited edition 2-CD/DVD set of Chapter V. On September 6, 2006, they performed an acoustic show in the Hiro Ballroom, New York City, that was recorded for their singles collection. The band played sixteen songs, including three covers: Tool's "Sober", Pink Floyd's "Comfortably Numb", and Alice in Chains's "Nutshell".

The collection The Singles: 1996–2006 was released on November 14, 2006. It included all the band's singles, the three covers performed at the New York show, and a remastered version of "Come Again" from Staind's first independent release Tormented.

The Illusion of Progress (2008–2009)
On August 19, 2008, Staind released their sixth album, The Illusion of Progress. Prior to the album's release, the track "This Is It" was available for download on the iTunes Store, as well as for Rock Band. The album debuted at No. 3 on the U.S. Billboard 200, No. 1 on the Top Modern Rock/Alternative Albums Chart, No. 1 on the Top Digital Albums Chart, and also No. 1 on the Top Internet Albums Chart, with first-week sales of 91,800 units. The first single on the album, "Believe", topped Billboard's Top 10 Modern Rock Tracks on September 5, 2008. The band also supported Nickelback on their 2008 European tour. The second single was "All I Want", and came out on November 24. The single also became Staind's 13th top 20 hit on the rock charts. In Europe, the second single was "The Way I Am", released on January 26, 2009. The final single released from the album, "This Is It", was sent to radio stations across the country on May 4, 2009. The track was also included on the successful Transformers: Revenge of the Fallen – The Album released in late June 2009. The same year, Staind embarked on a fall tour with the newly reunited Creed.

Staind and departure of Jon Wysocki (2010–2012)
In March 2010, Aaron Lewis stated the band would start working on their seventh studio album by the end of the year. Lewis had finished recording his country music solo EP and had started a nonprofit organization to reopen his daughter's elementary school in Worthington, Massachusetts. Guitarist Mike Mushok stated in a Q&A session with fans that the band was looking to make a heavy record, but still "explore some of the things we did on the last record and take them somewhere new for us". In a webisode posted on the band's website, Lewis stated that eight songs were written and that "every one of them is as heavy or heavier than the heaviest song on the last record".

In December 2010, Staind posted three webisodes from the studio, which featured the band members discussing the writing and recording process of their new album. They announced that as of April 20, they had completed the recording of their seventh and would release it later that year.

On May 20, 2011, Staind announced that original drummer Jon Wysocki had left the band. Drummer Will Hunt filled in for a few dates, while Wysocki's drum tech Sal Giancarelli filled in for the rest of the tour. Three days later, it was reported that Staind's new album would be a self-titled release. It was released on September 13, 2011. The first single, "Not Again", was released to active radio stations on July 18. The song "The Bottom" appeared on the Transformers: Dark of the Moon soundtrack. On June 30, Staind released a song called "Eyes Wide Open" from their new record. "Eyes Wide Open" would later be released on November 29 as the album's second single.

In November 2011, the band announced through their YouTube page that Sal Giancarelli was now an official member. The band continued to perform into 2012, embarking on an April and May tour with Godsmack and Halestorm, and they played the Uproar Festival in August and September with Shinedown and a number of other artists.

It was announced in July 2012 that the band was to be taking a hiatus. In an interview with Billboard, Aaron Lewis stated that "We're not breaking up. We're not gonna stop making music. We're just going to take a little hiatus that really hasn't ever been taken in our career. We put out seven records in 14 years. We've been pretty busy." Lewis also had plans to release his first solo album The Road. During this time, Mike Mushok auditioned, and was selected, to play guitar for former Metallica bassist Jason Newsted's new band Newsted. He featured on their debut album Heavy Metal Music.

Hiatus and limited activity (2013–present)
Staind played their first show in two years at the Welcome To Rockville Festival on April 27, 2014. They also played the Carolina Rebellion and  Rock on the Range festivals in May 2014.

In late 2014, the band went on a hiatus. Aaron Lewis continued to play solo shows and work on his next solo album. He also confirmed that the hiatus would last "for a while". Mike Mushok teamed up with former Three Days Grace singer Adam Gontier, former Finger Eleven drummer Rich Beddoe, and Eye Empire bassist Corey Lowery to form Saint Asonia.

On August 4, 2017, the band performed for the first time since November 2014 for an acoustic performance at Aaron Lewis' 6th annual charity golf tournament and concert when bassist Johnny April and drummer Sal Giancarelli joined Aaron Lewis and Mike Mushok to perform "Outside", "Something to Remind You", and "It's Been Awhile". Three days later, Lewis announced that Staind would never tour extensively again, with Lewis explaining:

In April 2019, the band announced they would reform in September 2019 for some live performances. The band was scheduled to play at Epicenter Festival on May 3, 2020 at Charlotte Motor Speedway, but the COVID-19 pandemic led to the festival being cancelled. Amid the pandemic, the band released a live album titled Live: It's Been Awhile on May 7, 2021. The recorded performance took place at the Foxwoods Resort Casino in Mashantucket, Connecticut.

In April 2022, the band announced a September tour, dubbed the Evening with Staind tour. In September, Mushok confirmed that a new Staind album would be released in 2023.

Musical style, influences, and lyrical themes
The topics of Staind's lyrics cover issues of depression, relationships, death, addiction, finding one's self, betrayal, and Lewis' thoughts about becoming a father in the song "Zoe Jane" from 14 Shades of Grey, as well as reflecting on his upbringing in the song "The Corner" from The Illusion of Progress. Also from 14 Shades of Grey, the track titled "Layne" was written about Alice in Chains frontman Layne Staley in response to his death in 2002. The song is also about Staley's legacy and the effect his music had on the members of Staind, especially Aaron Lewis. Staind has been categorized as nu metal,   hard rock, post-grunge, alternative metal, and heavy metal.

In 2001, Rolling Stone outlined the band's relationship to the nu metal label:
{{quote|Staind got their first break in 1998 when [Fred] Durst signed the band to his Flip Records. That association has linked the group with "new metal," though Break the Cycles sound is neither particularly new nor metal. The band doesn't rap, and though Mushok has adopted new-metal's minor-key guitar riffs, Lewis' dramatic voice and the anthemic quality of such songs as "Open Your Eyes" and "Fade" are more akin to Alice in Chains than to Korn. Aggressive yet reflective, Break the Cycle doesn't require a poisonous abundance of testosterone to be appreciated and is better suited to solitary listening than to the mosh pit.}}

Staind's influences include Pantera, The Doors, Suicidal Tendencies, Kiss, Van Halen, Slayer, Led Zeppelin, Sepultura, Whitesnake, the Beatles, Alice in Chains, Faith No More, Deftones, Black Sabbath, Pearl Jam, Tool, Rage Against the Machine, Nirvana, Stone Temple Pilots, Helmet, James Taylor, Korn, and Crosby, Stills & Nash.

Band membersCurrent line-up Aaron Lewis – lead vocals, rhythm guitar (1995–2012, 2014, 2017, 2019–present)
 Mike Mushok – lead guitar (1995–2012, 2014, 2017, 2019–present)
 Johnny April – bass, backing vocals (1995–2012, 2014, 2017, 2019–present)
 Sal Giancarelli – drums (2011–2012, 2014, 2017, 2019–present)Former members Jon Wysocki – drums (1995–2011)

Timeline

 Discography Studio albums'''Tormented (1996)Dysfunction (1999)Break the Cycle (2001)14 Shades of Grey (2003)Chapter V (2005)The Illusion of Progress (2008)Staind'' (2011)

References

External links
 
 
 

1995 establishments in Massachusetts
Atlantic Records artists
American alternative metal musical groups
American nu metal musical groups
American post-grunge musical groups
Rock music groups from Massachusetts
Alternative rock groups from Massachusetts
Heavy metal musical groups from Massachusetts
Flip Records (1994) artists
Musical groups established in 1995
Musical groups disestablished in 2017
Musical groups disestablished in 2014
Musical groups disestablished in 2012
Musical groups reestablished in 2014
Musical groups reestablished in 2019
Musical groups reestablished in 2017
Musical groups from Springfield, Massachusetts
Musical quartets